The canton of Sées is an administrative division of the Orne department, northwestern France. Its borders were modified at the French canton reorganisation which came into effect in March 2015. Its seat is in Sées.

It consists of the following communes:
 
Almenêches
Aunou-sur-Orne
Belfonds
La Bellière
Boissei-la-Lande
Boitron
Le Bouillon
Le Cercueil
Chailloué
La Chapelle-près-Sées
Le Château-d'Almenêches
La Ferrière-Béchet
Francheville
Macé
Médavy
Montmerrei
Mortrée
Neauphe-sous-Essai
Saint-Gervais-du-Perron
Sées
Tanville

References

Cantons of Orne